Russell Hairston (born February 10, 1964) is a former American football wide receiver in the National Football League for the Pittsburgh Steelers. He also played in the Arena Football League for the Pittsburgh Gladiators, New England Steamrollers and the Washington Commandos. He played college football at the University of Kentucky. Hairston was the first ever MVP of the AFL.

References

1964 births
Living people
People from Greenbelt, Maryland
American football wide receivers
Pittsburgh Steelers players
Pittsburgh Gladiators players
Washington Commandos players
New England Steamrollers players
Kentucky Wildcats football players
National Football League replacement players
Players of American football from Maryland